Joseph Edward "Jay" Lake, Jr. (June 6, 1964 – June 1, 2014) was an American science fiction and fantasy writer. In 2003 he was a quarterly first-place winner in the Writers of the Future contest. In 2004 he won the John W. Campbell Award for Best New Writer in Science Fiction. He lived in Portland, Oregon, and worked as a product manager for a voice services company.

Lake's writings appeared in numerous publications, including Postscripts, Realms of Fantasy, Interzone, Strange Horizons, Asimov's Science Fiction, Nemonymous, and the Mammoth Book of Best New Horror. He was an editor for the "Polyphony" anthology series from Wheatland Press, and was also a contributor to The Internet Review of Science Fiction.

Personal life
Lake was born in Taipei, Taiwan; he was the eldest of three children born to Joseph Edward Lake (a U.S. foreign service officer serving in Taiwan at the time).  As a child he lived in Nigeria; Dahomey (now called Benin); Canada; Washington, DC; and returned to Taiwan for a number of years when his father was posted there a second time.  He attended high school at Choate Rosemary Hall (in Connecticut) and later graduated from the University of Texas in 1986.

Lake publicly revealed his advanced case of colon cancer.  He was diagnosed in April 2008, and it then "progressed from a single tumor to metastatic disease affecting the lung and liver, recurring after multiple surgeries and chemotherapy courses."  He used crowd funding through YouCaring to pay for whole genome sequencing, towards the "small possibility that the results of such a test...may suggest a treatment path." Lake died of the illness on June 1, 2014, just five days before his 50th birthday.

Lake is the subject of a documentary called Lakeside – A Year With Jay Lake by Waterloo Productions. The film, which follows Lake's fight against cancer, had a special work-in-progress screening August 30, 2013, at the World Science Fiction Convention in San Antonio. , it is in post-production and is scheduled to premier at Sasquan in Spokane Washington during the 73rd World Science Fiction Convention on August 21, 2015.

His posthumously published collection Last Plane to Heaven was honored with the 2015 Endeavour Award.

Bibliography

The City Imperishable
 Trial of Flowers (October 2006) Night Shade Books
 Madness of Flowers (October 2009) Night Shade Books
 Reign of Flowers (forthcoming)

In addition to these three novels there are at least two more stories set in the City Imperishable:

 "The Soul Bottles" from the anthology Leviathan 4: Cities (ed. by Forrest Aguirre, Night Shade Books, Nov. 2004) is the first published story of The City Imperishable.
 "Promises: A Tale of the City Imperishable"  (2008) in Paper Cities: An Anthology of Urban Fantasy (ed. Ekaterina Sedia)

Mainspring universe
 Mainspring (June 2007) Tor Books
 Escapement (June 2008) Tor Books
 Pinion (March 2010) Tor Books
In addition to these three novels there are at least two more novellas set in the Mainspring Universe:
 "Chain of Fools" (Subterranean, Oct 2008) and
 "Chain of Stars" (Subterranean, Oct 2009), loose sequel to "Chain of Fools"

Green universe
 Green (June 2009) Tor Books
 Endurance (November 2011)
 Kalimpura (January 2013)
In addition to these three novels there are at least two more stories set in the world of Green:
 "A Water Matter" (Tor.com, 2008)
 "The Passion of Mother Vajpai" (with Shannon Page) in Subterranean: Tales of Dark Fantasy 2 (ed. by William Schafer, 2011)

Sunspin Universe
 Calamity of So Long a Life (forthcoming)
 Their Currents Turn Awry (forthcoming)
 The Whips and Scorns of Time (forthcoming)
 All Our Sins Remembered (forthcoming)
 "To Raise a Mutiny Betwixt Ourselves" (The New Space Opera 2, 2009, Harper Voyager)
 "Torquing Vacuum" (Clarkesworld Magazine, Feb 2010)
 "Permanent Fatal Errors" (Is Anybody Out There?, June 2010, DAW Books)
 "To This Their Late Escape" (The Sky That Wraps, August 2010, Subterranean Press)
 "A Long Walk Home" (Subterranean Online, Winter 2011)
 "The Weight of History, the Lightness of the Future" (Spring 2012, Subterranean Online)

Other novels
 Rocket Science (August 2005) Fairwood Press
 Death of a Starship (December 2009) MonkeyBrain Books (Sunspin Universe)
 The Specific Gravity of Grief (novella) (June 2010) Fairwood Press
 The Baby Killers (novella) (August 2010) PS Publishing
 Original Destiny, Manifest Sin (forthcoming)

Collections
 Greetings From Lake Wu, Wheatland Press (November 2003)
 Greetings from Lake Wu; Signed, numbered, luxury edition, Traife Buffet (2006)
 Green Grow the Rushes-Oh, Fairwood Press (2003)
 American Sorrows, Wheatland Press (August 2004)
 Dogs in the Moonlight, Prime Books (August 2004)
 The River Knows Its Own, Wheatland Press (September 2007)
 The Sky That Wraps, Subterranean Press (September 2010)
 Last Plane to Heaven: The Final Collection, Tor Books (September 2014)

Other works 
METAtropolis: The Wings We Dare Aspire, with Ken Scholes, WordFire Press (May 2014) (978-1614751564)

Edited works
Polyphony
 Polyphony 1 (with Deborah Layne), Wheatland Press (July 2002)
 Polyphony 2 (with Deborah Layne), Wheatland Press (April 2003)
 Polyphony 3 (with Deborah Layne), Wheatland Press (October 2003)
 Polyphony 4 (with Deborah Layne), Wheatland Press (October 2004)
 Polyphony 5 (with Deborah Layne), Wheatland Press (October 2005)
 Polyphony 6 (with Deborah Layne), Wheatland Press (December 2006)
 All-Star Zeppelin Adventure Stories (with David Moles), Wheatland Press/All-Star Stories (October 2004)
 TEL: Stories, Wheatland Press (August 2005)
 Spicy Slipstream Stories (with Nick Mamatas), Lethe Press (September 2008)
 The Exquisite Corpuscle (with Frank Wu), Fairwood Press (October 2008)
 Other Earths (with Nick Gevers), DAW Books (April 2009)
 Footprints (with Eric T. Reynolds), Hadley Rille Books (July 2009)
Down In The Ship Mines (2012) in SQ Mag, Edition 4 (ed. Sophie Yorkston)

Short fiction

References

External links
  

 Lakeshore, Lake's blog at LiveJournal
 

1964 births
2014 deaths
20th-century American male writers
20th-century American novelists
20th-century American short story writers
21st-century American male writers
21st-century American novelists
21st-century American short story writers
American expatriates in Benin
American expatriates in Canada
American expatriates in Nigeria
American expatriates in Taiwan
American fantasy writers
American male novelists
American male short story writers
American science fiction writers
Asimov's Science Fiction people
Deaths from colorectal cancer
John W. Campbell Award for Best New Writer winners
Novelists from Oregon
Steampunk writers
Weird fiction writers